The 2015 Cavan Intermediate Football Championship was the 51st edition of Cavan GAA's premier Gaelic football tournament for intermediate graded clubs in County Cavan, Ireland. The tournament consists of 13 teams, with the winner representing Cavan in the Ulster Intermediate Club Football Championship.

Cavan Gaels B withdrew from the championship before it began. For 2016 Cavan Gaels' second string didn't compete in against first teams in the championship.

2014 runners-up Ballyhaise won the championship, beating newly-promoted Arva in the final.

Team Changes
The following teams have changed division since the 2014 championship season.

To Championship
Promoted from 2014 Cavan Junior Football Championship
  Arva  -  (Junior Champions)
Relegated from 2014 Cavan Senior Football Championship
  Redhills

From Championship
Promoted to 2015 Cavan Senior Football Championship
  Cootehill  -  (Intermediate Champions)
Relegated to 2015 Cavan Junior Football Championship
  Kill Shamrocks
  Mountnugent

Opening rounds

Preliminary round

Round 1

Back-door stage

Round 2

Round 3

Knock-out stage

Quarter-finals

Semi-finals

Final

References

Cavan Intermediate Football Championship
Cavan GAA Football championships